The 1968 United States presidential election in Indiana was held on November 5th, 1968. State voters chose 13 representatives, or electors to the Electoral College, who voted for President and Vice-President.

Background
Indiana had been a traditionally Republican state that had turned away from Barry Goldwater in 1964 due to powerful hostility to Goldwater’s leanings from its Yankee and Appalachia-influenced Northern and Southern regions, despite having been the centre of a Democratic primary challenge from segregationist Alabama Governor George Wallace that attracted considerable support in towns that would soon become part of the “Rust Belt”. However, Wallace lost by worse than one-to-two against solitary opponent Matthew E. Welsh in Indiana and unlike in Maryland his Indiana support was mostly among the middle classes.

In the mid-term elections, the Republicans made major gains in Southern Indiana with its Appalachia influence and in the significantly German central section, but did less well in the north of the state.

1968 saw Indiana – for the second consecutive election – as the center of a major primary battle, this time involving Bobby Kennedy (who was to be assassinated by Sirhan Sirhan that June). Like his brother John, Bobby was interested in entering a primary in a highly Protestant and Southern-influenced state to test his strength. as JFK had done in West Virginia. RFK would win the state, but his performance was regarded as disappointing especially in white urban areas where he was outpolled by Eugene McCarthy.

Vote
Nixon was able, as expected, to restore Indiana’s Republican dominance, defeating Humphrey by 12.30 percentage points. Wallace, in a state with considerable “Southern” influence, had some late October polls place him even with Humphrey at around 20%, but the former Alabama Governor would lose almost half of this by polling day. Wallace gained his most substantial support in urban ethnic districts where resentment of blacks and recent race riots had become substantial over the previous two years, but did not do so well elsewhere in the state since – like Goldwater – he was viewed as too aligned with the Deep South. 

Nixon’s victory was the first of ten consecutive Republican victories in the state, as Indiana would not vote Democratic again until Barack Obama narrowly won the state in 2008. However, Indiana has remained a safe Republican state since then.

Results

Results by county

See also
 United States presidential elections in Indiana

Notes

References

1968 Indiana elections
Indiana
1968